Onil is a town located in the comarca of L'Alcoià, in the province of Alicante, Spain. It has an area of 48.41 km2 and, according to the 2006 census, a total population of 7466 inhabitants and a population density of 154.22 inhabitants/km2. Onil is located next to the mountain called Sierra de Onil in the Sierra de Mariola, 36 km from Alicante city.

The economy of Onil is based on the industries of toy, construction and farming (almonds and olives).

The most important monuments in Onil are the Palace-Fortress from the 16th century, which is the headquarters of the town council; the Catholic church of Santiago Apóstol (from the 17th-18th century) and the Hermitages of San Buenaventura (from the 17th century) and Santa Ana.

The Moros y Cristianos festival of Onil is celebrated each April.

External links 
Web Oficial de Onil, Official Web page of the municipal government of Onil 
Índice Estadístico Municipal de Onil. Unidad de Documentación de la Diputación de Alicante  
Información de Onil 
Fiestas de Onil 
Federación Valenciana de Municipios y Provincias - Guía Turística  :es:Wikipedia:Autorización de copia de web/Federación Valenciana de Municipios y Provincias

Municipalities in the Province of Alicante